Ranong ( (Pronunciation)) is a town (thesaban mueang) in southern Thailand, capital of the Ranong Province and the Mueang Ranong District. The town covers completely the area of the tambon Khao Niwet (เขานิเวศน์). As of 2005, it had a population of 16,163.

Geography
Ranong is on the estuary of the Pak Chan (or Kraburi) River, opposite Myanmar's Kawthaung (formerly Victoria Point). The Tenasserim Hills rise directly to the east of Ranong, and another small ridge runs along the edge of the estuary to the town's north.

Climate
Ranong has a tropical monsoon climate (Köppen climate classification Am). There is little variation in the temperature throughout the year, although the pre-monsoon months (February to April) are somewhat hotter in the day. However, Ranong's position to the west of the Tenasserim Hills means that the monsoon season's rains are greatly amplified, resulting in torrential rains from May until October, and significant rainfall in the transition months of April and November.

Transportation
Phet Kasem Road (Thailand Route 4) runs through the city.

The Port Authority of Thailand operates the Ranong Port, which is Thailand's principal Indian Ocean port. In 2008, the Ranong human-smuggling incident resulted in 54 deaths.

References

External links

 
Populated places in Ranong province
Myanmar–Thailand border crossings
Ports and harbours of the Indian Ocean
Cities and towns in Thailand